Nuclear Cowboy is the fourth solo album by British musician John Sykes, released in 2000. The record saw Sykes experimenting with drum loops and other elements of hip hop production.

Track listing

All songs written and composed by John Sykes, except where noted.

Personnel
Credits are adapted from the album's liner notes.

References

2000 albums
John Sykes albums
Albums produced by John Sykes